Survival skills are techniques used in order to sustain life in any type of natural environment or built environment. These techniques are meant to provide basic necessities for human life, including water, food, and shelter. Survival skills also support proper knowledge and interactions with animals and plants to promote the sustaining of life over a period of time. 

Survival skills are basic ideas and abilities that ancient peoples invented and passed down for thousands of years. Today, survival skills are often associated with surviving in a disaster situation.  

Outdoor activities such as hiking, backpacking, horseback riding, fishing, and hunting all require basic wilderness survival skills, especially to handle emergency situations. Individuals who practice survival skills as a type of outdoor recreation or hobby may describe themselves as survivalists. Survival skills are often used by people living off-grid lifestyles such as homesteaders. Bushcraft and primitive living are most often self-implemented but require many of the same skills. There are also many instances of survival skills being utilized by criminals, such as fugitives, draft dodgers, poachers, serial killers, illegal immigrants, escaped prisoners, organized criminals and terrorists, who avoid capture by authorities by hiding in wilderness areas. Additionally, both park rangers and conservation officers are taught survival skills to help them find missing persons, and in case they themselves become stranded while investigating wilderness crimes. The United States Armed Forces has a training program called SERE, in which military personnel, Department of Defense civilians, intelligence personnel, and private military contractors are taught survival skills and techniques for evading capture and escaping from captivity, in the event that they need to survive and hideout in wilderness areas while avoiding capture by enemy combatants.

First aid 

First aid (wilderness first aid in particular) can help a person survive and function with injuries and illnesses that would otherwise kill or compromise them. Common and dangerous injuries include:
 Bites from snakes, spiders and other wild animals
 Bone fractures
 Burns
 Drowsiness
 Headache
 Heart attack
 Hemorrhage
 Hypothermia and hyperthermia
 Infection from food, animal contact, or drinking non-potable water
 Poisoning from poisonous plants or fungi
 Sprains, particularly of the ankle
 Vomiting
 Wounds, which may become infected

The person may need to apply the contents of a first aid kit or, if possessing the required knowledge, naturally occurring medicinal plants, immobilize injured limbs, or even transport incapacitated comrades.

Shelter 

Many people who are forced into survival situations often have an elevated risk of danger because of direct exposure to the elements. Many people in survival situations die of hypothermia or hyperthermia, or animal attacks. An effective shelter can range from a natural shelter, such as a cave, overhanging rock outcrop, or a fallen-down tree, to an intermediate form of man-made shelter such as a debris hut, tree pit shelter, or a snow cave, to a completely man-made structure such as a tarp, tent, or a longhouse. It is noted that some common properties between these structures are:

Location (away from hazards, such as cliffs; and nearby materials, like food sources)

Insulation (from ground, rain, wind, air, or sun)

Heat Source (either body heat or fire-heated)

Personal or Group Shelter (having multiple individuals)

Fire 
Fire is a tool that is helpful for meeting many survival needs. A campfire can be used to boil water, rendering it safe to drink, and to cook food. Fire also creates a sense of safety and protection, which can provide an overlooked psychological boost. When temperatures are low, fire can postpone or prevent the risk of hypothermia. In a wilderness survival situation, fire can provide a sense of home in addition to being an essential energy source. Fire may deter wild animals from interfering with an individual, though some wild animals may also be attracted to the light and heat of a fire.

There are numerous methods for starting a fire in a survival situation. Fires are either started with a concentration of heat, as in the case of the solar spark lighter, or through a spark, as in the case of a flint striker. Fires will often be extinguished if either there is excessive wind, or if the fuel or environment is too wet. Lighting a fire without a lighter or matches, e.g. by using natural flint and metal with tinder, is a frequent subject of both books on survival and in survival courses, because it allows an individual to start a fire with few materials in the event of a disaster. There is an emphasis placed on practicing fire-making skills before venturing into the wilderness. Producing fire under adverse conditions has been made much easier by the introduction of tools such as the magnesium striker, solar spark lighter, and the fire piston.

Water 

A human being can survive an average of three to five days without water. Since the human body is composed of an average of 60% water, it should be no surprise that water is higher on the list than fire or food. The need for water dictates that unnecessary water loss by perspiration should be avoided in survival situations. Perspiration and the need for water increase with exercise. Although the human water intake varies greatly depending on factors like age and gender, the average human should drink about 13 cups or 3 liters per day. Many people in survival situations perish due to dehydration, and/or the debilitating effects of water-borne pathogens from untreated water.

A typical person will lose a minimum of two to four liters of water per day under ordinary conditions, and more in hot, dry, or cold weather. Four to six liters of water or other liquids are generally required each day in the wilderness to avoid dehydration and to keep the body functioning properly. The U.S. Army survival manual does not recommend drinking water only when thirsty, as this leads to inadequate hydration. Instead, water should be consumed at regular intervals. Other groups recommend rationing water through "water discipline."

A lack of water causes dehydration, which may result in lethargy, headaches, dizziness, confusion, and eventually death. Even mild dehydration reduces endurance and impairs concentration, which is dangerous in a survival situation where clear thinking is essential. Dark yellow or brown urine is a diagnostic indicator of dehydration. To avoid dehydration, a high priority is typically assigned to locating a supply of drinking water and making provisions to render that water as safe as possible.

Recent thinking is that boiling or commercial filters are significantly safer than the use of chemicals, with the exception of chlorine dioxide.

Food 
Culinary root tubers, fruit, edible mushrooms, edible nuts, edible beans, edible cereals or edible leaves, edible cacti, ants and algae can be gathered and, if needed, prepared (mostly by boiling). With the exception of leaves, these foods are relatively high in calories, providing some energy to the body. Plants are some of the easiest food sources to find in the jungle, forest or desert because they are stationary and can thus be obtained without exerting much effort. Animal trapping, hunting, and fishing allow a survivalist to acquire high-calorie meat, but require certain skills and equipment (such as bows, snares, and nets).

Focusing on survival until rescued, the Boy Scouts of America especially discourages foraging for wild foods on the grounds, as the knowledge and skills needed to make a safe decision are unlikely to be possessed by those finding themselves in a wilderness survival situation.

Navigation 

When going on a hike or trip in an unfamiliar location, search and rescue advises to notify a trusted contact of your destination, your planned return time, and then notify them when returning. In the event you do not return in the specified time frame, (e.g. 12 hours of the scheduled return time), your contact can contact the police for search and rescue.

Survival situations can often be resolved by finding a way to safety, or a more suitable location to wait for rescue. Types of navigation include:
 Celestial navigation, using the sun and the night sky to locate the cardinal directions and to maintain course of travel
 Using a map, compass or GPS receiver
 Dead reckoning
 Natural navigation, using the condition of surrounding natural objects (i.e. moss on a tree, snow on a hill, direction of running water, etc.)

Mental preparedness 
Mental clarity and preparedness are critical to survival. The will to live in a life-and-death situation often separates those that live and those that do not. Even well-trained survival experts may be mentally affected in disaster situations. It is critical to be calm and focused during a disaster.

To the extent that stress results from testing human limits, the benefits of learning to function under stress and determining those limits may outweigh the downside of stress. There are certain strategies and mental tools that can help people cope better in a survival situation, including focusing on manageable tasks, having a Plan B available, and recognizing denial.

Urban survival

Earthquake
Governments such as the United States and New Zealand advise that in an earthquake, one should "Drop, Cover, and Hold."

New Zealand Civil Defense explains it this way:
DROP down on your hands and knees. This protects you from falling but lets you move if you need to.
COVER your head and neck (or your entire body if possible) under a sturdy table or desk (if it is within a few steps of you). If there is no shelter nearby, cover your head and neck with your arms and hands.
HOLD on to your shelter (or your position to protect your head and neck) until the shaking stops. If the shaking shifts your shelter around, move with it.

The United States Federal Emergency Management Agency (FEMA) adds that in the event of a building collapse, it is advised that you:
 Seek protection under a structure like a table
 Cover your mouth with your shirt to filter out dust
 Don't move until you are confident that something won't topple on you
 Use your phone light to signal for help, or call

Important survival items 

Survivalists often carry a "survival kit." The contents of these kits vary considerably, but generally consist of items that are necessary or useful in potential survival situations, depending on the anticipated needs and location. For wilderness survival, these kits often contain items like a knife, water vessel, fire-starting equipment, first aid equipment, tools to obtain food (such as snare wire, fish hooks, or firearms), a light source, navigational aids, and signaling or communications devices. Multi-purpose tools are often chosen because they serve multiple purposes, allowing the user to reduce weight and save space.

Preconstructed survival kits may be purchased from various retailers, or individual components may be bought and assembled into a kit.

Controversial survival skills
Some survival books promote the "Universal Edibility Test." Allegedly, it is possible to distinguish edible foods from toxic ones by exposing your skin and mouth to progressively greater amounts of the food in question, with waiting periods and checks for symptoms between these exposures. However, many experts reject this method, stating that even a small amount of some "potential foods" can cause physical discomfort, illness, or even death.

Many mainstream survival experts have recommended the act of drinking urine in times of dehydration and malnutrition. However, the U.S. Army Survival Field Manual (FM 21-76) instructs that this technique is a myth and should never be used. There are several reasons to avoid drinking urine, including the high salt content of urine, potential contaminants, and the risk of bacterial exposure, despite urine often being touted as "sterile."

Many classic western movies, classic survival books, and even some school textbooks suggest that using your mouth to suck the venom out of a venomous snake bite is an appropriate treatment. However, venom that has entered the bloodstream cannot be sucked out, and it may be dangerous for a rescuer to attempt to do so. Similarly, some survivalists promote the belief that when bitten by a venomous snake, drinking your urine provides natural anti-venom. Effective snakebite treatment involves pressure bandages and prompt medical treatment, and may require antivenom.

See also
 Alone (TV show)
 Bicycle touring
 Bushcraft
 Distress signal
 Hazards of outdoor recreation
 Indigenous peoples
 Mini survival kit
 Survivalism
 Ten Essentials
 Woodcraft

References

Further reading
 Mountaineering: The Freedom of the Hills; 8th Ed; Mountaineers Books; 596 pages; 1960 to 2010; .
 The Knowledge: How to Rebuild Our World from Scratch; Penguin Books; 352 pages; 2014; .

External links

 
Media
 
 
 
 
 
 
 
 

 
Foraging